An intensivist, also known as a critical care doctor, is a medical practitioner who specializes in the care of critically ill patients, most often in the intensive care unit (ICU). Intensivists can be internists or internal medicine sub-specialists (most often pulmonologists), anesthesiologists, emergency medicine physicians, pediatricians (including neonatologists), or surgeons who have completed a fellowship in critical care medicine. The intensivist must be competent not only in a broad spectrum of conditions among critically ill patients but also with the technical procedures and equipment (i.e. mechanical ventilators) used in the intensive care setting.

Training in the United States
After medical school there are several different routes to becoming an intensivist. One can do a three year internal medicine residency, and then a three year pulmonology/critical care fellowship, or a two year critical care fellowship. Also, if starting with internal medicine, it is possible to do a different specialty fellowship entirely, such as three years of cardiology of gastroenterology, and then an additional one year fellowship in critical care medicine.It is also possible to complete a residency first in general surgery, anesthesiology, and emergency medicine before applying for a 1-2 year fellowship in critical care.

Role in healthcare
Intensivists most often work in the intensive care unit. These physicians oversee the majority of care of these patients and make decisions about treatment, testing, procedures, consultations, etc. Majority of the patients that are admitted to the ICU are severely ill, and these physicians are experts at managing their complex challenges including multiple organ failure, life-threatening infections, trauma victims, and more. They must work with a large number of other professionals including physician assistants/nurse practitioner, registered nurses, pharmacists, respiratory therapists, and more.

References

Intensivists